Spring Bluff is a rural locality in the Toowoomba Region, Queensland, Australia. In the  Spring Bluff had a population of 6 people.

Geography

History 
The area is named after a railway station in the area. The Spring Bluff railway station located on the boundary with Lockyer Valley Region local government area, was built in the 1860s to allow trains a place to stop during the steep climb from Brisbane to nearby Toowoomba. In 1890, it was named Spring Bluff after the spring water and the sandstone bluff in the area.

The railway station closed in August 1992. The station and its gardens are heritage listed, and are maintained by a trust consisting of the regional councils of Toowoomba and Lockyer Valley along with Queensland Rail, who also operate a cafe at the site. Due to the floods at Spring Bluff and nearby Murphys Creek in early 2011, the station was closed for repairs for several months.

In the  Spring Bluff had a population of 6 people.

References

External links
 Official site

Suburbs of Toowoomba
Localities in Queensland